The 1924 Cleveland Bulldogs season was their second season in the league. The team finished 7–1–1, the best record in the league, making them 1924 NFL Champions.

Schedule

A December 7, 1924, game against the Chicago Bears (a 23–0 loss) was stricken from the league records.

Standings

References

Cleveland Bulldogs seasons
Cleveland Bulldogs
National Football League championship seasons
Cleveland Bulldogs